The Santa Susana Formation is a Paleogene period geologic formation in the Simi Hills and western Santa Susana Mountains of southern California.

The formation consists largely of light-gray shale and some fine-grained shaly sandstone, with a lens of heavy conglomerates in the lower part. Small beds of limestone are also present.

Fossil content 
The Santa Susana Formation preserves fossils from the Late Paleocene to Early Eocene epochs in the Paleogene period of the Cenozoic Era. Fossilized fauna in the Santa Susana Formation is entirely different from that of underlying Martinez Formation, and has very little in common with that of the overlying Meganos Formation.

See also 

 
 List of fossiliferous stratigraphic units in California
 
 Paleontology in California

References

External links 

Geologic formations of California
Paleocene Series of North America
Eocene Series of North America
Paleogene California
Conglomerate formations
Sandstone formations of the United States
Shale formations of the United States
Geology of Los Angeles County, California
Geology of Ventura County, California
Simi Hills
Santa Susana Mountains
Chatsworth, Los Angeles
Geography of Simi Valley, California
West Hills, Los Angeles
Paleontology in California